Edwin C. Dutton is a Malaya footballer who played for Selangor and Malaya national team as a centre-back.

Career overview
He start played as centre-back with Selangor FA between 1950 to 1962 and also former skipper for them.

Edwin was a part of the Malaya national team that play in the first ever edition, inaugural Pestabola Merdeka 1957. He also was a squad player for Malaya that captured the 1958, 1959 and 1960 Merdeka Tournament editions.

On 3 September 1962, he was a part of the Malaya player that winning bronze medals in the 1962 Asian Games.

Honour
Selangor
Malaysia Cup: 1948, 1956, 1959, 1961, 1962

Malaya
Merdeka Cup: 1958, 1959, 1960
Sea Games: Gold medal 1961
Asian Games: Bronze medal 1962

References

Malaysian footballers
Malaysia international footballers
Association football defenders
1928 births
Living people
Selangor FA players
20th-century births